Marayrazo (possibly from Quechua maray batan or grindstone; to tear down, to knock down, rasu snow, ice) is a mountain in the Andes of Peru which reaches a height of approximately .  It is located in the Junín Region, Jauja Province, Apata District.

References 

Mountains of Peru
Mountains of Junín Region